United Nations Security Council resolution 1324, adopted unanimously on 30 October 2000, after recalling all previous resolutions on the question of the Western Sahara, in particular resolutions 1108 (1997), 1292 (2000), 1301 (2000), 1308 (2000) and 1309 (2000), the Council extended the mandate of the United Nations Mission for the Referendum in Western Sahara (MINURSO) until 28 February 2001.

The Security Council welcomed the efforts of the Secretary-General's Personal Envoy James Baker and MINURSO to implement the Settlement Plan and agreements adopted by Morocco and the Polisario Front to hold a free and fair referendum on self-determination for the people of Western Sahara. At the same time it noted that fundamental differences between the parties still remained.

The mandate of MINURSO was extended in order to resolve areas of disagreement and find a mutually acceptable solution. The Secretary-General Kofi Annan was requested to provide an assessment of the situation before the end of MINURSO's mandate on 28 February 2001.

See also
 Free Zone (region)
 History of Western Sahara
 Political status of Western Sahara
 List of United Nations Security Council Resolutions 1301 to 1400 (2000–2002)
 Sahrawi Arab Democratic Republic
 Moroccan Western Sahara Wall
 List of United Nations resolutions concerning Western Sahara

References

External links
 
Text of the Resolution at undocs.org

 1324
2000 in Morocco
 1324
 1324
October 2000 events
2000 in Western Sahara